Jeux sans frontières was a Europe-wide television game show. The 1994 edition was won by the team from Česká Třebová in the Czech Republic.

Participating countries

Heats

Heat 1 - Batalha, Portugal

Heat 2 - Valletta, Malta

Heat 3 - Hradec Králové, Czech Republic

Heat 4 - Pécs, Hungary

Heat 5 - Rome, Italy

Heat 6 - Batalha, Portugal

Heat 7 - Valletta, Malta

Heat 8 - Poros, Greece

Heat 9 - Ljubljana, Slovenia

Heat 10 - Rome, Italy

Final 
The final round was held in Cardiff in Wales.

Qualifying teams 
The teams which qualified from each country to the final were:

Final table 

Jeux sans frontières
1994 television seasons
Television game shows with incorrect disambiguation